Donald Burns (14 August 1921 – 20 February 1987) was a New Zealand cricket umpire. He stood in one Test match, New Zealand vs. South Africa, in 1964.

See also
 List of Test cricket umpires
 South African cricket team in New Zealand in 1963–64

References

1921 births
1987 deaths
Sportspeople from Dunedin
New Zealand Test cricket umpires